Right Place, Wrong Time may refer to:

 "Right Place, Wrong Time" (song), a song by Dr. John
 Right Place, Wrong Time (album), an album by Otis Rush
 "Right Place, Wrong Time", a song by Avant from Director
 "Right Place, Wrong Time", a song by Screaming Jets from Heart of the Matter
 "Right Place, Wrong Time", a song by Soul Position from 8 Million Stories
 Right Place, Wrong Time (film), a 2008 film directed by Michael Allen Carter

See also
 Wrong Place, Right Time, an album by Haymaker
 Right Place, Right Time (disambiguation)